A Gilded Eternity is the third studio album by the rock band Loop. Released in 1990 on Situation Two, it was a commercial success, topping the UK Indie Charts (as their previous album Fade Out had done) and reaching #39 on the official UK album charts.

Track listing
The original LP release (SITU 27) consisted of two 12" discs, played at 45rpm:

The original CD release (SITU 27 CD) contained ten tracks:

Charts

References

1990 albums
Loop (band) albums